The 2020 Women's African Olympic Qualification Tournament was a volleyball tournament for women's national teams held in Yaoundé, Cameroon from 5 to 9 January 2020. Five teams played in the tournament, where the winner qualified for the 2020 women's Olympic volleyball tournament.

Pools composition
The qualifying tournament featured 5 teams.

Pool standing procedure
 Number of matches won
 Match points
 Sets ratio
 Points ratio
 Result of the last match between the tied teams

Match won 3–0 or 3–1: 3 match points for the winner, 0 match points for the loser
Match won 3–2: 2 match points for the winner, 1 match point for the loser

Round robin
All times are Cameroon Standard Time (UTC+01:00).

|}

|}

See also
Volleyball at the 2020 Summer Olympics – Men's African qualification

References

External links

2020 in volleyball
Volleyball qualification for the 2020 Summer Olympics
January 2020 sports events in Africa